The Campania regional election of 1980 took place on 8 June 1980.

Events
Christian Democracy was by far the largest party, while the Italian Communist Party came distantly second. After the election, Christian Democrat Emilio De Feo was elected President of the Region. In 1983 De Feo was replaced by fellow Christian Democrat Antonio Fantini.

Results

Source: Ministry of the Interior

Elections in Campania
1980 elections in Italy